Eilema insignis is a moth of the subfamily Arctiinae. It was described by Arthur Gardiner Butler in 1882. It is found in Madagascar and possibly Tanzania.

References

insignis
Moths described in 1882